The Golden Collar Awards reward the best canine actors. The trophies are delivered during a ceremony, similar to other ceremonies of the cinema industry.

History
The Golden Collar Awards were created in 2012 by the website Dog News Daily, a commercial web site dedicated to the products for dogs that has been created in 2009.

The first Golden Collar Awards rolled out the red carpet for the dogs on 13 February 2012 in a luxury hotel, the Hyatt Regency Century Plaza in Los Angeles, in front of an audience composed of the press. The trophy has been created by designer Simon Tavassoli: it consists in a statue that represents an Italian Leather Collar with embedded shiny Swarovski crystals.

Some criticism has been expressed that the awards were only launched a couple of months prior, due to the attention the dog Uggie was getting for his performance in The Artist.

Categories
The dogs and their owners or trainers concur in five catégories:
 Best Dog in a Theatrical Film
 Best Dog in a Foreign Film
 Best Dog in a Television Series
 Best Dog in a Reality Television Series
 Best Dog in a Direct-To-DVD Film

An honorary prize rewards the "humanitarian" (animal protection) or the "legends" of the dogs on the screen:
 Honorary Golden Collar Award

Prizes

Prizes 2012
The 2012 edition has been presented by actresses Pauley Perrette and Wendie Malick.

 Best Dog in a Theatrical Film : Uggie, Jack Russell terrier, as "the dog" in The Artist, trainer Omar Von Muller
 Best Dog in a Foreign Film : Koko, Australian Kelpie, as « Red Dog » in the Australian film Red Dog
 Best Dog in a Television Series, Musical or Comedy : Brigitte, French Bulldog, as « Stella » in Modern Family
 Best Dog in a Reality Television Series : tie Giggy, Pomeranian, in The Real Housewives of Beverly Hills, and Hercules, Pit bull, in Pit Boss
 Best Dog in a Direct-To-DVD Film : Rody, Labrador Retriever, as « Marley » in Marley & Me: The Puppy Years

See also

 List of American television awards

Notes and references

External links
 Dog News Daily  web site

American television awards
Awards established in 2012
Awards to animals
American film awards